The San Pedro Martir whiptail (Aspidoscelis martyris) is a species of teiid lizard endemic to San Pedro Mártir Island in Mexico.

References

martyris
Reptiles described in 1891
Taxa named by Leonhard Stejneger
Reptiles of Mexico